= European Information Technology Observatory =

Market research Company

- Industry: Technology
- Founded: 1993; 33 years ago
- Website: eito.com

The European Information Technology Observatory (EITO) gathers information on European and global markets for information technology, telecommunications and consumer electronics. The EITO is managed by Bitkom Research GmbH, a wholly owned subsidiary of BITKOM, the German Association for Information Technology, Telecommunications and New Media. EITO is sponsored by Deutsche Telekom, KPMG and Telecom Italia. The research activities of the EITO Task Force are supported by the European Commission and the OECD.

The EITO exists thanks to an initiative of Enore Deotto from MIlan and the support of Luis-Alberto Petit Herrera (Madrid), Jörg Schomburg (Hanover) and Günther Möller (Frankfurt). Between 1993 and 2007, the market reports were published as printed annual reports ("EITO yearbook"). Since 2008 the market reports are available in electronic version and can be purchased on the EITO online portal.

Currently, the ICT market reports are divided into following categories:

- International Reports

International Reports include ICT market information of all EITO countries and all market segments or only specific segments. The newest ICT Market Report 2013/14, published in October 2013, includes market data of 36 countries: 28 European markets, BRIC countries, Japan, Turkey and the US as well as a deep analysis of ICT market developments in 9 European countries. The detailed market data and forecasts are available for the period 2010–2014.

- Country Reports

This category includes EITO reports on a single country's ICT market. The Country ICT Market Reports are published biannually for France, Germany, Italy, Spain and the United Kingdom.

- Thematic Reports

Thematic studies focusing on a specific topic.

- Customized Reports

Market Reports made upon order.
